Archer is an American animated comedy series created by Adam Reed for the FX network. The first four seasons are set at the International Secret Intelligence Service (ISIS) and surround suave master spy Sterling Archer as he deals with global espionage; a domineering, late middle-aged mother/boss, Malory Archer; his ex-girlfriend, Agent Lana Kane; and accountant Cyril Figgis.

The fifth season follows archer and his entourage as they resort to drug dealing, having been caught operating as illegal espionage operation in the seasons' opening. This concludes with archer being shot, which sets the plot for the following seasons (7-10) in which he is in a coma. In the more recent seasons, the show returns to the spy-agency format.

On September 28, 2021, FXX renewed the series for a thirteenth season, which premiered on August 24, 2022. 

Season 14 is currently rumored to be in production (according to Cyril Figgis voice Actor Chris Parnell) though this has not been announced publicly.

Series overview

Episodes

Season 1 (2009–10)

Season 2 (2011)

Season 3 (2011–12)

Season 4 (2013)

Season 5: Archer Vice (2014)

Season 6 (2015)

Season 7 (2016)

Season 8: Archer Dreamland (2017)

Season 9: Archer: Danger Island (2018)

Season 10: Archer: 1999 (2019)

Season 11 (2020)

Season 12 (2021)

Season 13 (2022)

Ratings 
<noinclude>

References

External links 
 
 

Lists of American adult animated television series episodes
Lists of American sitcom episodes